Pettinato is a surname. Notable people with the surname include:

 Giovanni Pettinato (1934–2011), Italian paleographer
 Roberto Pettinato (born 1955), Argentine musician and journalist
 Tuono Pettinato (1976–2021), Italian comics writer and illustrator

Italian-language surnames